Performance archaeology is a subset of archaeological theory. Developers of this theory include Michael Shanks, Mike Pearson and Julian Thomas who in the 1990s at University of Wales, Lampeter began formulating concepts which view the social aspect of performance along with the artistic nature of theatre together through an interdisciplinary lens as "an integrated approach to recording, writing and illustrating the material past" thereby marrying the academic with the artistic. Performance archaeology has further expanded in the last decade upon the theories of presence. Geoff Bailey states that "because we believe that the present is known or knowable better than the past, we must seek our inspiration in studies of present phenomena and our concepts and theories from authorities on the present." Michael Shanks along with Ian Hodder, Christopher Witmore, Gabriella Giannachi and Nick Kaye have recently expanded the theory further by calling for cooperation within the humanities and studying transdisciplinary research from archaeologists who are encouraged to become storytellers in order to more diversely analyze the engagement of the actor, the audience, the things and the space in which they perform by using an 'ecology of practices'. The theory of performance archaeology aims to give researchers a multi temporal link to the antiquated through studying the processual nature of "performance of presence" which is entangled within the 'multipleness' of time. Echoing theories posited by Martin Heidegger, the processual and temporal natures of performance are phenomenologically entwined with the experiences of the performers and audience. Stories are preserved by memory through performance. These performances can be seen both in the archaeological record as well in modern enactments or rituals. The landscape itself is an integral portion of performance memory. Performance archaeology sets itself apart from performance history by directing focus not toward the past itself but instead toward what has become of the past by taking an ethnoarchaeological approach of analyzing the 'archaeology of present' cultures which allows for a richer interpretation of past performance. Performance archaeology takes a cross-disciplinary approach with 'social archaeology' to studying the things, narratives or artifacts, that remain of ancient theatre, music, dance, art history and oral tradition in order to 'model the past'. The following examples illustrate components that might aptly demonstrate aspects of performance archaeology.

Oral Cultures 
Oral cultures lacking text experience performance through epic poetry, storytelling and ritual passed down and circulated by elders, shamans and storytellers. Performance archaeology joins these experiences with material objects and geographic as well as architectural locales in order to analyze the archaic. Oral tradition utilizes bards and griots as singers of stories which are set to music in order to better retain the memory of their tales through song.

Ancient Percussion Instruments (Idiophones) 
Ancient idiophones were instruments intended to "support man's natural feeling for dance and rhythm" and included clappers, scrapers, rattles, sistra, cymbals and bells and have been found in both ancient Mesopotamia as well as ancient Egypt. The sistra has been linked to ancient performances associated with the goddesses Bastet, Sekhmet, and Hathor and were used in ceremonies for warding off evil spirits.

Ancient Drums (Membranophones) 
Drums are prevalent among the Sumerians, Babylonian and Hittites, but rarely found among the Egyptians. Drumming with sticks was a technique not introduced into Mesopotamia or Egypt until the later Roman invasion in the 1st century CE.

Ancient Wind Instruments (Aerophones) 
Flutes, oboes, horns, trumpets and pan pipes have been found in ancient Mesopotamia and Egypt while clarinets are indigenous to Egypt alone where they may have also been called by the Arabic zummara. The organ originated in 3rd century BCE Alexandrian Egypt by fusing a pan pipe with a keyboard.

Ancient Stringed Instruments (Chordophones) 
Lyres of Ur have been found throughout what is modern-day Iraq at the Royal Cemetery at Ur "perhaps intended to provide melodic accompaniment for the dead" that date back to the 3rd millennium BCE. Sumerian lyres tend to be in the shape of an animal's head with the supporting sides mimicking animal horns.

In Ancient Greece a lyre made of a tortoise shell was referred to as a chelys can be found on hydriai pots dating back as far as the 8th century BCE. These instruments played a daily role in child-related activities as well as during multiple performances such as symposia, weddings and komoi and were related to the god Hermes as referenced by Homer.

Lyres were not indigenous to Egypt and did not become popular until centuries after being introduced by a Syrian nomad.

Harps have been linked to ancient Sumerian, Babylonian, Assyrian and Persian cultures, but were most popular in Egypt.

Ancient Theatrical Performance

Ancient Egypt 
The earliest form of theatre was thought to have begun as early as the 19th century BCE in Abydos, Egypt in religious ceremonies known as 'Passion Plays' whereby priests annually and ritually reenacted the Osiris myth in performances that traveled with Osiris' sacred barque on a roundtrip journey from his temple to his tomb and back. This processional festival brought travelers from the entirety of Egypt. Those who could afford to erected monuments to themselves along the route so that even in the afterlife they would still be able to participate in the festival. Performance in Egypt persisted for another millennia as described by the Rhind mortuary papyri which records the burial ceremonies of Menthesuphis and his wife who perished circa 9 BCE entailing a "dramatic performance, with the priests assuming the roles of the gods." In these instances ritual is enacted through performance in order to join the realms of the living with the dead and also to create a space where the worlds of the living and dead could simultaneously merge as "this complex festival culture connect(s) heaven, the earth, and the world of the dead". Recurring festival performances were held annually or seasonally. As festival culture emerged, so too did the ritual performances or 'festival plays' that served the purpose of both associating the ruling king with the gods as exemplified in the Luxor feast which was annually performed as a "cultic affirmation of the king as son of god (Amun)", as well as during the Festival of Valley when the king associated himself with his forefathers in the cult of the 'ancestor gods' in order to "assure himself of their blessings as the legitimate son of his bodily ancestors". Traces of the Osiris Myth as performance archaeology have endured and can be seen in modern stories such as Hamlet and The Lion King.

India 
In Classical India, theatre was used as a way to both provide a source of entertainment as well as to relay moral advice from their epic poetry. The Natya Shastra is a Sanskrit text dating back to the 5th century describing the performing arts. Episodes of the performances are depicted in sixty-two reliefs found within Prambanan temple located in Java. Music, dance and theatre were all closely interwoven within both the Hindu and Buddhist cultures.

Japan 
Kabuki

Greece 
Ancient Greek tragedy has been linked to rituals stemming from the cult of Cult of Dionysus.

Ancient dance 

Musicians and dancers played important roles in ancient Egyptian performance. Elite women in ancient Egypt adorned their hips with trinkets including not only aesthetically pleasing ornamental gold, shells and jewels, but also noise-making trinkets that were thought to both ward off evil spirits and invoke the goddess Hathor and appeal to her sexual nature in order to promote fertility. Modern belly dance is thus a derivative of this older Egyptian practice. Through the archaeological record dancers can be seen in artwork such as the Tomb of the Dancers painting in Thebes. 

Violent war performances were reenacted in Mesoamerica by elaborately plumed war dancers. The representation of maize was personified by human/plant hybrid models which were utilized for ritual purposes. Dramatic enactments of this nature are presumed to have been used for the purpose of sympathetic magic in order to win in battle in the former instance, as well as to resurrect the spirit of the vegetation each Spring in the latter. A theatrical performance was reconstructed in Guatemala in 1543 CE that incorporated music along with the Dance of Hunahpu and Xbalanque, the Maya Hero Twins, which portrayed their descent into and resurrection from Xibalba. Theatrical performances also frequently incorporated both music and dance into a procession as exemplified on limestone murals found in Bonampak, Mexico. Here musicians playing drums, rattles and turtle shells accompany actors wearing bizarre costumes in an elaborate ceremony welcoming a child heir to the throne. Maya hieroglyphic inscriptions show people posed in "highly-stylized gestures...explicitly labeled in accompanying text as 'dance'" and are thought of as a form of sign language. Instruments used in Maya culture such as horns, turtle shells, drums and rattles can be found in their visual art.

Alessandra Lopez y Royo analogizes dance to poetry describing the karanas, or dance movements artistically portrayed on the temple walls, as the 'sentences' left for us to re-embody the 'vocabulary' of the dance. 'Contemporary dance' of Indian performance arts on the other hand is a "distinct genre" and can be interpreted as the product of Western or 'non-traditional' influence.

References 

Archaeology